The William Thomas Turner Barn was built in 1898 near Gardner, Kansas, United States. The Turner barn is regarded as an outstanding example of barn construction, built by Arthur J. Clinton, a highly regarded barn builder.  The barn has been extensively photographed and has been featured in magazines, greeting cards, calendars and other publications.

The barn was built to a high standard of craftsmanship, using red cypress, a durable wood not often used in Kansas. The barn has a limestone foundation. The barn has two levels. It is capped by two large wood ventilators. The interior has two main levels, with a large hayloft on the upper level. The lower level has intersecting corridors running down the center between the facades, with accommodations for 15 horses and three grain bins.

The Turner barn's exterior materials and detailing are in a remarkable state of preservation. It was placed on the National Register of Historic Places on April 1, 1999.
The Turner Barn is still owned by the Turner Family and is open to the public.

References

External links

Barns on the National Register of Historic Places in Kansas
Infrastructure completed in 1898
Buildings and structures in Johnson County, Kansas
Barns in Kansas
National Register of Historic Places in Johnson County, Kansas